H30 or H-30 may refer to:
 H30 (Long Island bus), in Suffolk County, New York
 Dongfeng Fengshen H30, a Chinese hatchback
 , a Royal Navy B-class destroyer
 , a Royal Navy H class submarine
 McCulloch H-30, an American tandem-rotor helicopter 
 Nissan H30, an automobile engine

See also 
 Hydronium (H3O+), with a letter O instead of a zero